Lucaci is a surname. Notable people with the surname include:

Ciprian Lucaci (born 1996), Romanian rugby union player
Constantin Lucaci (1923–2014), Romanian sculptor
Vasile Lucaci (born 1969), Romanian rugby union player
Viorel Lucaci (born 1986), Romanian rugby union player

Romanian-language surnames